The 1954 municipal election was held October 13, 1954 to elect five aldermen to sit on Edmonton City Council and three trustees each to sit on the public and separate school boards.  The electorate also decided seven plebiscite questions.  No election was held for mayor, as William Hawrelak was one year into a two-year term.

There were ten aldermen on city council, but five of the positions were already filled:
Harold Tanner (SS), Rupert Clare, Abe Miller, Charles Simmonds, and Cliffard Roy (SS) were all elected to two-year terms in 1953 and were still in office.

There were seven trustees on the public school board, but four of the positions were already filled: Mary Butterworth (ss), William Cowley, James Falconer, and John Thorogood (SS) had been acclaimed to two-year terms in 1953 and were still in office.  The same was true on the separate board, where Andre Dechene, Amby Lenon (SS), Catherine McGrath, and William Sereda were continuing.

Voter turnout

There were 20,866 ballots cast out of 123,040 eligible voters, for a voter turnout of 17.0%.

Results

 bold or  indicates elected
 italics indicate incumbent
 "SS", where data is available, indicates representative for Edmonton's South Side, with a minimum South Side representation instituted after the city of Strathcona, south of the North Saskatchewan River, amalgamated into Edmonton on February 1, 1912.

Aldermen

Public school trustees

Separate (Catholic) school trustees

Plebiscites

 Financial plebiscite items required a minimum two-thirds "Yes" majority to bring about action

Paving

Shall Council pass a bylaw creating a debenture debt in the sum of $550,000 for the City share of standard paving of arterial and residential streets?
Yes - 10,749
No - 1,670

Asphalt Surfacing I

Shall Council pass a bylaw creating a debenture debt in the sum of $450,000 for the City share of paving means of asphalt surfacing on gravel?
Yes - 9,809
No - 2,004

Asphalt Surfacing II

Shall Council pass a bylaw creating a debenture debt in the sum of $150,000 for the City share of paving by means of asphalt surfacing on gravel?
Yes - 9,345
No - 2,097

Parks

Shall Council pass a bylaw creating a debenture debt in the sum of $100,000 for the rehabilitation and development of parks including new trees, new roads, sewers, drains, fences and general rebuilding?
Yes - 9,859
No - 2,112

Neighbourhood Beautification

Shall Council pass a bylaw creating a debenture debt in the sum of $91,500 for the completion of neighborhood beautification areas in various parts of the City including the beautification of small parcels of land owned within the City?
Yes - 8,808
No - 2,898

Playgrounds

Shall Council pass a bylaw creating a debenture debt in the sum of $61,000 for the improvement of playgrounds and the construction of playground shelters and wading pools and the erection of fencing at various City playgrounds?
Yes - 10,623
No - 1,677

Health Clinic

Shall Council pass a bylaw creating a debenture debt in the sum of $60,000 for the purpose of a health clinic to look after inoculations, also the supervision of babies and pre-school children and preventative dental services?
Yes - 10,623
No - 1,677

References

Election History, City of Edmonton: Elections and Census Office

1954
1954 elections in Canada
1954 in Alberta